Julie Rayne is a British singer and entertainer, noted for her television appearances and recordings from the early 1960s.

Life and work
Rayne was born in Darlington and was educated at the Darlington High School for Girls.  Rayne started out at the Darlington Hippodrome as soubrette with Geordie comic Bobby Thompson in the Merry Magpies revue.  When the show closed, she moved to London and soon found work in the Soho music clubs.  Her first big break came when she was asked to join Dr. Crock and His Crackpots' comedy show band.

She performed briefly as Julie James and Julie Jones until signed by Norman Newell at HMV, who settled on the name Julie Rayne. Her fourth record, 'Green With Envy, Purple With Passion, White With Anger, Scarlet With Fever, What Were You Doing in Her Arms Last Night Blues?' entered the Guinness Book of Records for the longest song title.  She became well-known through frequent appearances on British television, most notably as one of the resident singers on the first series of Stars and Garters which was voted best light entertainment series on television in the same year (1963) and on radio shows such as Sing it Again and Saturday Club.  She was backed by the top outfits of the day, including the Alan Ainsworth, Tony Osborne and John Barry Orchestras, appeared at top venues such as the Royal Festival Hall and the Royal Albert Hall.

This was an interesting period for Julie, meeting and working with many of the top names in music, comedy and variety. Having already worked with Sir Cliff Richard, she was intrigued to hear him speak at a Billy Graham meeting and this triggered her interest in wanting to know more. A hiatus in her career eventually followed while she spent a brief period as a missionary and then as a student, obtaining a degree and teaching qualification at London University.

When she returned to show business full-time, she added additional strings to her bow. As a stage actress, she appeared in numerous productions, including straight theatre as well as musicals, reviews and pantomime.  She has also been a director and producer as well as a mentor and model.

Her later performances often include one Christian song as an expression of her faith.  Minister Fred B. Craddock mentions in his book an instance in Germany where Rayne performed a version of Psalm 121 amongst popular songs from the 1940s through to the 1960s.  Craddock asked to meet with Rayne after a performance and wondered why Rayne chose to include a Christian song in her performance.  Rayne answered that she 'had made a promise to God to include a song of praise in every performance.'

Already a published writer, she has just completed the manuscript of a novel loosely based on her own experiences entering showbiz.  Though she has not appeared on television since 2000, or radio since 2012, Julie is still an active singer.

References

Living people
English women singers
People from Darlington
Year of birth missing (living people)
Musicians from County Durham
Actors from County Durham